Pavetta monticola is a species of plant in the family Rubiaceae. It is found in Equatorial Guinea and São Tomé and Príncipe.

References

monticola
Vulnerable plants
Taxonomy articles created by Polbot